Kushk-e Olya or Kooshk Olya may refer to:
 Kushk-e Olya, Kerman
 Kushk-e Olya, Kohgiluyeh and Boyer-Ahmad

See also
 Kushk-e Bala